Hydrelia brunneifasciata is a moth in the family Geometridae. It is found from British Columbia, through Washington to California.

References

Moths described in 1876
Asthenini
Moths of North America